Bhima Kunda (tank) is located beyond the western compound wall of the Bhimesvara Temple precinct, in Kapila Prasad, Old Town, Bhubaneswar. It is now under the care and maintenance of Bhimesvara Temple Development Committee. The tank was excavated by cutting through the laterite bed rock. The embankment is made of dressed laterite blocks.

Ownership
Single/ Multiple: Multiple

Public/ Private: Private
It is under the care and maintenance of Bhimesvara Temple Development Committee.

Address: Kapila Prasad, Bhimatangi, Bhubaneswar

Property Type
Precinct/ Building/ Structure/Landscape/Site/Tank: Tank

Typology: Embankments

Property use
Abandoned/ in use: In use.

Present use: Temple rituals as well as normal bathing.

Past use: Could not be ascertained.

Significance
Cultural significance: Kartika Purnima, Pinda is also offered.

Social significance: Mundanakriya

Associational significance: Bhimesvara Temple Development Committee.

Physical description
Surrounding: The tank has embankments on all the four sides. The Bhimesvara temple precinct stands on its eastern embankment, Bhubaneswar-Jatani road, on its west, private residential buildings in north and open space in south.

Orientation: Bathing ghat provided with steps in the southern embankment.

Architectural features (Plan & Elevation)
The tank is square on plan measuring 38.10 square metres with a depth of 5.50 metres. It has an entrance in the south and there are
flights of steps leading down to the tank. The section cutting through the laterite bed served as walls of the tank on all its four sides.

Decorative features

Building material: laterite

Construction techniques: Dry masonry.

Special features, if any: It is a seasonal tank as the water dries up during the summer season.

State of preservation
Good/Fair/ Showing Signs of Deterioration/Advanced: Bad state of preservation because of the growth of wild vegetations on its outer wall.

Condition description

Repairs and Maintenance: It is repaired and maintained by the Bhimesvara Temple Development Committee.

Grade (A/B/C)
Architecture: B

Historic: C

Associational: B

Social/Cultural: B

Reference and notes

1. K.C. Panigrahi, Archaeological Remains at Bhubaneswar, Calcutta, 1961. P. 174.

2. L. S.S. O’ Malley, Bengal District Gazetter Puri, Calcutta 1908, P. 241.

3. M.M. Ganguly, Orissa and Her Remains, Calcutta, 1912, P. 274.

4. R.L. Mitra. The Antiquities of Orissa, Calcutta, 1963, P. 162.

External links 
 https://web.archive.org/web/20121009191050/http://ignca.nic.in/asp/showbig.asp?projid=orkhr0210001
 http://www.allwebarticles.com/arts/khandwa-%E2%80%93-historical-city-of-madhya-pradesh/

Temple tanks in Odisha
Tourist attractions in Bhubaneswar